Jaka Bijol (born 5 February 1999) is a Slovenian professional footballer who plays as a centre-back for Italian club Udinese and the Slovenia national team. Initially a defensive midfielder, he switched to his current position in the 2021–22 season.

Career
On 22 June 2018, CSKA Moscow announced the signing of Bijol on a five-year contract from Rudar Velenje. On 18 September 2020, Bijol was loaned out to Hannover 96 for one year.

On 14 July 2022, Bijol was signed by Serie A club Udinese on a five-year contract for a reported transfer fee of over €4 million.

Career statistics

Club

International 

Scores and results list Slovenia's goal tally first, score column indicates score after each Bijol goal.

Honours
CSKA Moscow
Russian Super Cup: 2018

References

External links
Jaka Bijol at NZS 

1999 births
Living people
Slovenian footballers
Association football midfielders
Association football defenders
Slovenia international footballers
Slovenia under-21 international footballers
Slovenia youth international footballers
Slovenian PrvaLiga players
Russian Premier League players
2. Bundesliga players
Serie A players
NK Rudar Velenje players
PFC CSKA Moscow players
Hannover 96 players
Udinese Calcio players
Slovenian expatriate footballers
Slovenian expatriate sportspeople in Russia
Expatriate footballers in Russia
Slovenian expatriate sportspeople in Germany
Expatriate footballers in Germany
Slovenian expatriate sportspeople in Italy
Expatriate footballers in Italy